The following ships of the Indian Navy have been named INS Prabal:

Indian Navy ship names